Chula Vista is a census-designated place (CDP) in Cameron County, in the U.S. state of Texas. Prior to the 2010 census the community was part of the Chula Vista-Orason CDP. It is part of the Brownsville–Harlingen Metropolitan Statistical Area.

Geography
It is bordered on the west by Orason.

References

Census-designated places in Cameron County, Texas
Census-designated places in Texas